Machevo is a rural locality (a village) in Yurochenskoye Rural Settlement, Sheksninsky District, Vologda Oblast, Russia. The population was 21 as of 2002.

Geography 
Machevo is located 37 km south of Sheksna (the district's administrative centre) by road. Glyadkovo is the nearest rural locality.

References 

Rural localities in Sheksninsky District